Kaadu is a 1973 Indian Kannada-language film written and directed by Girish Karnad. The screenplay was based on a novel of the same name by Srikrishna Alanahalli. It stars Master G. S. Nataraj, Amrish Puri and Nandini Bhaktavatsala. The film won awards at the 21st National Film Awards and the 21st Filmfare Awards South.

Kamal Haasan called it one of his favourite films and said this film served as inspiration for his film Thevar Magan (1992).

Plot
Kitti, an eight-year-old boy, is brought from a city to a village called Koppal by his uncle, Chandre Gowda. Gowda is married to Kamali and the couple are childless. Kitti develops a deep attachment to Kamali and the thick forests in Koppal. Gowda is a frequent visitor to a nearby village called Hosur, where he has a mistress, Basakka. Kamali is aware of her husband's extra marital relationship, but remains helpless. On one evening, Kamali takes Kitti and a servant along with her to the forest. They meet a witch who performs a sacrifice which is meant to keep Gowda away from Basakka. He assures Kamali that she will get back her husband from the fold of Basakka. Kitti gets to know about his uncle's extramarital affair. The fight between two individuals turns into a feud between the two villages Koppalu and Hosuru. Kamali is convinced that the effect of the witchcraft is beginning to take place. Meanwhile, Gowda gets a message from Basakka, asking him not to come to Hosur as his life might be under danger. Gowda thinks that his pride is hurt, and to prove his courage he sends her a message that he will come the following night. A distressed Kamali makes a second attempt to keep her husband at home. She decides to go to the witch but is fatally attacked by Hosur Shivaganga's men on the way. This leads to the villagers of Koppal launch a massive attack on their Hosur counterparts. In the fight that ensues, Shivaganga gets killed by Gowda's servants. The police come to the village and arrest  Chandre Gowda and other criminals and sets up an outpost near the villages, and ask the villagers to pay fine for its maintenance. This also ensures that the villagers are refrained from conducting the Nyaya.

Cast 
 Master G. S. Nataraj as Kitti, Gowda's nephew
 Amrish Puri as Chandre Gowda
 Nandini Bhaktavatsala as Kamali, Gowda's wife
 Sunder Raj as kencha
 Lokesh as Shivaganga
 Uma Shivakumar as the Basakka, Gowda's mistress
 Kalpana Sirur
 T. S. Nagabharana

Production and theme
The film is based on a novel of the same name by Kannada writer Srikrishna Alanahalli. The story combines three interdependent themes – the tragedy that shocks the village, the tragic story of Kamali, and the story of the eight-year-old boy who visualises all these events. The story is seen through the eyes of Kitti. Ashish Rajadhyaksha and Paul Willemen in their book, Encyclopedia of Indian Cinema, noted that the boy cannot distinguish between the "man-made violence" and the "primeval threats" presented by the dense forest; according to a legend, the forest has a killer bird that calls out its victims by name.

The film was Karnad's first venture as an independent director. Amrish Puri, a regular face in Shyam Benegal's films was chosen to play the main lead. The cinematography was handled by Govind Nihalani, who was also associated with Benegal. B. V. Karanth composed the film score and was in charge of art direction. T. S. Nagabharana, who would later go on to become an independent filmmaker, worked as a costume designer and assisted Karnad in the film.

Legacy
Kaadu is regarded as one of the earliest Parallel Cinema in the Kannada film industry. Ashish Rajadhyaksha and Paul Willemen in their book, Encyclopedia of Indian Cinema, noted that Karnad's Kaadu and Benegal's Ankur placed both filmmakers "squarely within New Indian Cinema's ruralism".

Kamal Haasan called it one of his favourite films and said this film served as inspiration for his film Thevar Magan (1992).

Awards
21st National Film Awards
 Second Best Feature Film – K. N. Narayan, G. N. Lakshmipathy (producers) and Girish Karnad (director)
 Best Actress – Nandini Bhaktavatsala
 Best Child Artist – Master G. S. Nataraj

Karnataka State Film Awards 1973-74
 Second Best Film
 Best Actress – Nandini Bhaktavatsala
 Best Story Writer – Srikrishna Alanahalli
 Best Sound Recording – A. Govindaswamy
 Best Child Actor – G. S. Nataraj

22nd Filmfare Awards South
 Best Film – K. N. Narayan and G. N. Lakshmipathy
 Best Director – Girish Karnad

4th International Film Festival of India
 Special Mention Award

Footnotes

Citations

References

External links
 

1970s Kannada-language films
Indian thriller films
Indian black-and-white films
Films based on Indian novels
Films set in forests
Films set in Karnataka
Films featuring a Best Actress National Award-winning performance
Second Best Feature Film National Film Award winners
Films directed by Girish Karnad
1970s thriller films